Shock Treatment is the third studio album by American rapper Krizz Kaliko, released on September 14, 2010. Other titles the artist considered for the album, before deciding on Shock Treatment, were "Son of Sam" and "Walk on Water."

Track listing

References

2010 albums
Krizz Kaliko albums
Albums produced by Seven (record producer)
Strange Music albums